Gould is an unincorporated community in Cherokee County, located in the U.S. state of Texas. According to the Handbook of Texas, the community had a population of 20 in 2000. It is located within the Tyler-Jacksonville combined statistical area.

History
The area in what is known as Gould today was first settled in the 1870s and was a station on the International-Great Northern Railroad. A post office was established at Gould in 1905 and remained in operation until 1918. It had 80 residents that were served by a sawmill and a general store in 1914, which remained open until the 1930s and closed after World War II. Its population was 20 in 2000.

Geography

Education
Gould is served by the Troup Independent School District.

Notes

Unincorporated communities in Cherokee County, Texas
Unincorporated communities in Texas